Ponciano may refer to:

Girau do Ponciano, a municipality in the western of the Brazilian state of Alagoas
Ponciano Arriaga International Airport, an international airport at San Luis Potosí, San Luis Potosí, Mexico
San Ponciano church, a chapel in La Plata, Argentina

People with the name
Élmer Ponciano (born 1978), Guatemalan football defender
Selvyn Ponciano (born 1973), retired Guatemalan football defender
Ponciano Arriaga (1811–1865), lawyer and politician from San Luis Potosí
Ponciano B.P. Pineda, Filipino writer, teacher, linguist and lawyer
Ponciano Bernardo (1905–1949), Filipino engineer and politician who served as mayor of Quezon City
Ponciano Leiva (1821–1896), President of Honduras 1874–1876 and 1891–1893

See also
Ponce (disambiguation)
Pons
Pontian (disambiguation)
Pontianus (disambiguation)

pt:Ponciano
tl:Ponciano